Neobalinae is a small subfamily in the family Cicadellidae (leafhoppers).

Description
Neobaline leafhoppers are often darkly coloured with fluorescent accents.

Distribution
Members of the subfamily are found feeding on Dicotyledon trees and shrubs in the Neotropics.

Genera
There are nine genera in this subfamily (not arranged into tribes).

 Benala Oman, 1938
 Calliscarta Stål, 1869
 Chibala Linnavuori & DeLong, 1977
 Conala Oman, 1938
 Exolidia Osborn, 1923
 Neobala Oman, 1938
 Perubala Linnavuori, 1959
 Psibala Kramer, 1963
 Rhobala Kramer, 1963

References

Cicadellidae
Hemiptera subfamilies